Guri Agnes Richter (7 July 1917 – 21 August 1995) was a Danish film actress. She appeared in 13 films between 1940 and 1990.

Filmography
 Farlig leg (1990)
 Erasmus Montanus (1973)
 Mig og min lillebror og Bølle (1969)
 Mig og min lillebror og storsmuglerne (1968)
 Mig og min lillebror (1967)
 I stykker (1966)
 Utro (1966)
 Paradis retur (1964)
 Den rige enke (1962)
 I gabestokken (1950)
 Regnen holdt op (1942)
 Gå med mig hjem (1941)
 Barnet (1940)

External links

1917 births
1995 deaths
Danish film actresses
Actresses from Copenhagen
20th-century Danish actresses